Westgate Mall or Westgate Shopping Centre may refer to:

Canada
 Westgate Shopping Centre (Ottawa) in Ottawa, Ontario, Canada

Kenya
 Westgate, Nairobi
 Westgate shopping mall attack, four-day 2013 terrorist attack with at least 67 deaths, resulting in the partial collapse of the mall

Singapore
 Westgate, Singapore

South Africa 
 Westgate Shopping Centre, Johannesburg

United Kingdom
 Westgate, Oxford in Oxford, England
 Westgate Park Shopping Centre, part of Basildon Town Centre

United States
 Westgate Center, California
 Westgate Mall (Amarillo, Texas)
 Westgate Mall (Bethlehem, Pennsylvania)
 Westgate Mall (Brockton), Massachusetts
 Westgate Mall (Fairview Park, Ohio)
 Westgate Mall (Macon, Georgia)
 Westgate Mall (Spartanburg, South Carolina)
 Westgate Plaza (Albany, New York)

See also 
 Westgate (disambiguation)